Mission Park station is a light rail stop on the MBTA Green Line E branch, located on Huntington Avenue in the Mission Hill neighborhood of Boston, Massachusetts.

The station is located on a street running segment of the E branch; trains run in mixed traffic rather than a dedicated median. The station has no platforms; riders wait on the sidewalks (shared with bus stops for the route  and  buses) and cross the street to reach trains. Because of this, the station is not accessible. In 2021, the MBTA indicated plans to modify the Heath Street–Brigham Circle section of the E branch with accessible platforms to replace the existing non-accessible stopping locations.

References

External links

MBTA - Mission Park
Station from Google Maps Street View

Green Line (MBTA) stations
Railway stations in Boston